The 2007 Houston Dynamo season was the second season of existence for the Houston franchise. The Dynamo were the defending MLS Cup champions from the previous season and prevailed to win back-to-back MLS Cups as they defeated the New England Revolution for the second year in a row in the MLS Cup final.  The Dynamo also competed in the CONCACAF Champions' Cup, U.S. Open Cup, and North American SuperLiga during the 2007 season.

Summary 
The Dynamo entered 2007 as defending champions, having defeated the New England Revolution in MLS Cup 2006.  The result qualified them for the 2007 CONCACAF Champions' Cup, their first continental tournament in franchise history.  The Dynamo began their season in the Champions Cup; defeating Puntarenas F.C. in the quarterfinals before losing to C.F. Pachuca in the semifinals.  Houston had a disappointing Open Cup, losing in the third round to the Charleston Battery.  The Dynamo also competed in the inaugural North American SuperLiga, finishing top of the group before losing to Pachuca 4–3 on penalties in the semifinals.

In MLS play, Houston struggled early in the season, losing 5 of their first 8 matches.  The Dynamo then went on an 11 match unbeaten streak, with 8 wins during the streak, helping them climb up to top of the table.  Houston had 5 wins, 4 losses, 3 draws over their final 11 games, enough of a dip in form to let D.C. United win the Supporters' Shield by 3 points and Chivas USA claim the top seed in the Western Conference by 1 point.

In the MLS Cup Playoffs, Houston matched up with Texas Derby rivals FC Dallas in the Conference Semifinals.  Dallas won the first leg 1–0 thanks to a goal from Clarence Goodson.  Houston got off to a poor start, with Carlos Ruiz scoring in the 14th minute to put the Dynamo down 2–0 on aggregate.  The game turned in the 47th minute when Arturo Álvarez was shown a red card for violent conduct.  Stuart Holden and Brian Ching then scored once each to level the aggregate score and send the game to extratime.  In extratime, Ching scored in the 97th and Brad Davis scored in the 100th minute to help Houston advance to the next round.   Facing off with the Kansas City Wizards in the Conference Final, the Dynamo rode goals from Nate Jaqua and Dwayne De Rosario to a 2–0 win and a return to MLS Cup.  However star striker Brian Ching left the game due to an injury that forced him to miss the final.  Houston met the New England Revolution in MLS Cup 2007, a rematch of the 2006 final.  Taylor Twellman gave the Revs the lead after scoring in the 20th minute.  Houston responded in the second half when Joseph Ngwenya scored the equalizer in the 61st minute.  In the 74th minute De Rosario headed in a Brad Davis cross to give the Dynamo a 2–1 lead.  Houston held onto the lead, becoming the second team in MLS history to win consecutive MLS Cups.

Final roster

Appearances and goals are totals for MLS regular season only.

Player movement

In 
Per Major League Soccer and club policies terms of the deals do not get disclosed.

Out

Friendlies

Carolina Challenge Cup

Competitions

Major League Soccer

Standings

Western Conference

Overall 

 – Toronto FC cannot qualify for the CONCACAF Champions League through MLS.  Rather, they can qualify through the Canadian Championship.If they had qualified for the Champions League through MLS, then the highest placed team not already qualified would have qualified.
 – The winner of the 2007 MLS Supporters' Shield (D.C. United) and the winner of MLS Cup 2007 (Houston Dynamo) qualified for the 2008 CONCACAF Champions' Cup and the 2008–09 CONCACAF Champions League Group Stage. The runner-up of MLS Cup 2007 and the winner of the 2007 U.S. Open Cup (New England Revolution) qualified for the 2008–09 CONCACAF Champions League Preliminary Round. Because New England qualified twice, the additional berth in the preliminary round was awarded to the 2007 MLS Supporters' Shield runner-up (Chivas USA).

Matches

MLS Cup Playoffs

US Open Cup

CONCACAF Champions' Cup

Quarterfinals

Semifinals

SuperLiga

Player statistics

Appearances, goals, and assists 
{| class="wikitable sortable" style="text-align:center;"
|+
! rowspan="2" |
! rowspan="2" |
! rowspan="2" |
! rowspan="2" |
! colspan="3" |
! colspan="3" |
! colspan="3" |
! colspan="3" |
! colspan="3" |
! colspan="3" |
|-
!!!!!!!!!!!!!!!!!!!!!!!!!!!!!!!!!!!
|-
|1||GK||||align=left|||11||0||0||4||0||0||0||0||0||1||0||0||4||0||0||2||0||0
|-
|2||DF||||align=left|||37||3||2||25||2||2||4||0||0||1||0||0||3||0||0||4||1||0
|-
|3||DF||||align=left|||3||0||0||1||0||0||0||0||0||0||0||0||2||0||0||0||0||0
|-
|4||DF||||align=left|||20||1||0||16||1||0||0||0||0||1||0||0||0||0||0||3||0||0
|-
|5||DF||||align=left|||35||1||1||25||1||0||4||0||1||1||0||0||3||0||0||2||0||0
|-
|6||DF||||align=left|||13||1||1||9||0||1||0||0||0||0||0||0||4||1||0||0||0||0
|-
|7||FW||||align=left|||22||2||1||16||1||1||0||0||0||1||0||0||3||1||0||2||0||0
|-
|8||FW||||align=left|||10||1||0||5||0||0||0||0||0||1||0||0||4||1||0||0||0||0
|-
|9||MF||||align=left|||40||2||4||28||1||3||4||0||0||1||0||0||4||1||0||3||0||1
|-
|11||MF||||align=left|||25||4||5||17||3||3||4||1||1||0||0||0||4||0||1||0||0||0
|-
|13||MF||||align=left|||23||2||3||19||2||3||0||0||0||0||0||0||3||0||0||1||0||0
|-
|14||MF||||align=left|||36||9||8||24||6||4||4||2||2||0||0||0||4||0||2||4||1||0
|-
|15||FW||||align=left|||8||0||0||4||0||0||0||0||0||0||0||0||4||0||0||0||0||0
|-
|16||DF||||align=left|||33||0||5||21||0||2||4||0||2||0||0||0||4||0||1||4||0||0
|-
|17||MF||||align=left|||1||0||0||0||0||0||0||0||0||1||0||0||0||0||0||0||0||0
|-
|18||GK||||align=left|||34||0||0||27||0||0||4||0||0||0||0||0||1||0||0||2||0||0
|-
|19||MF||||align=left|||1||0||0||0||0||0||0||0||0||1||0||0||0||0||0||0||0||0
|-
|20||MF||||align=left|||0||0||0||0||0||0||0||0||0||0||0||0||0||0||0||0||0||0
|-
|21||FW||||align=left|||24||8||3||15||6||2||4||1||0||1||0||0||0||0||0||4||1||1
|-
|22||MF||||align=left|||31||6||7||22||5||5||4||1||0||1||0||0||1||0||1||3||0||1
|-
|23||MF||||align=left|||1||0||0||0||0||0||0||0||0||1||0||0||0||0||0||0||0||0
|-
|24||DF||||align=left|||42||0||2||30||0||2||4||0||0||0||0||0||4||0||0||4||0||0
|-
|25||FW||||align=left|||30||12||5||20||7||2||3||2||1||0||0||0||3||2||1||4||1||1
|-
|26||MF||||align=left|||26||0||4||22||0||4||0||0||0||1||0||0||0||0||0||3||0||0
|-
|27||MF||||align=left|||1||0||0||0||0||0||0||0||0||1||0||0||0||0||0||0||0||0
|-
|29||GK||||align=left|||0||0||0||0||0||0||0||0||0||0||0||0||0||0||0||0||0||0
|-
|30||MF||||align=left|||36||0||7||28||0||5||4||0||1||0||0||0||0||0||0||4||0||1
|-
|31||MF||||align=left|||1||0||0||0||0||0||0||0||0||1||0||0||0||0||0||0||0||0
|-
|33||FW||||align=left|||33||9||5||25||7||3||4||1||2||0||0||0||0||0||0||4||1||0

Disciplinary record 

{| class="wikitable sortable" style="text-align:center;"
|+
! rowspan="2" |
! rowspan="2" |
! rowspan="2" |
! rowspan="2" |Player
! colspan="2" |Total
! colspan="2" |MLS
! colspan="2" |Playoffs
! colspan="2" |U.S. Open Cup
! colspan="2" |Champions Cup
! colspan="2" |SuperLiga
|-
!style="width:30px;"|!!style="width:30px;"|!!style="width:30px;"|!!style="width:30px;"|!!style="width:30px;"|!!style="width:30px;"|!!style="width:30px;"|!!style="width:30px;"|!!style="width:30px;"|!!style="width:30px;"|!!style="width:30px;"|!!style="width:30px;"|
|-
|1||GK||||align=left|Zach Wells||1||0||0||0||0||0||0||0||1||0||0||0
|-
|2||DF||||align=left|Eddie Robinson|||16||2||11||1||1||0||0||0||2||1||0||0
|-
|3||DF||||align=left|Kevin Goldthwaite|||1||0||0||0||0||0||0||0||1||0||0||0
|-
|4||DF||||align=left|Patrick Ianni||3||1||3||0||0||0||0||0||0||0||0||1
|-
|5||DF||||align=left|Ryan Cochrane|||7||1||6||1||1||0||0||0||0||0||0||0
|-
|6||DF||||align=left|Kelly Gray|||1||0||0||0||0||0||0||0||1||0||0||0
|-
|7||FW||||align=left|Chris Wondolowski|||1||0||0||0||0||0||0||0||1||0||0||0
|-
|8||FW||||align=left|Paul Dalglish|||3||0||0||0||0||0||1||0||2||0||0||0
|-
|9||MF||||align=left|Brian Mullan|||8||0||4||0||0||0||0||0||1||0||3||0
|-
|11||MF||||align=left|Brad Davis|||2||0||1||0||0||0||0||0||1||0||0||0
|-
|13||MF||||align=left|Ricardo Clark|||2||1||2||1||0||0||0||0||0||0||0||0
|-
|14||MF||||align=left|Dwayne De Rosario|||8||0||5||0||1||0||0||0||1||0||1||0
|-
|15||FW||||align=left|Alejandro Moreno|||1||0||0||0||0||0||0||0||1||0||0||0
|-
|16||DF||||align=left|Craig Waibel|||2||0||1||0||0||0||0||0||1||0||0||0
|-
|21||FW||||align=left|Nate Jaqua|||5||0||3||0||1||0||0||0||0||0||1||0
|-
|22||MF||||align=left|Stuart Holden|||2||0||2||0||0||0||0||0||0||0||0||0
|-
|24||DF||||align=left|Wade Barrett|||4||0||2||0||1||0||0||0||1||0||0||0
|-
|25||FW||||align=left|Brian Ching|||1||0||0||0||1||0||0||0||0||0||0||0
|-
|26||MF||||align=left|Corey Ashe|||2||1||2||0||0||0||0||0||0||0||0||1
|-
|27||MF||||align=left|Erik Ustruck|||1||0||0||0||0||0||1||0||0||0||0||0
|-
|30||MF||||align=left|Richard Mulrooney|||3||0||2||0||1||0||0||0||0||0||0||0
|-
|33||FW||||align=left|Joseph Ngwenya|||5||0||4||0||0||0||0||0||0||0||1||0

Clean sheets 
{| class="wikitable" style="text-align:center;"
|+
!Rank!!Nat.!!Player!!MLS!!Playoffs!!U.S. Open Cup!!Champions Cup!!SuperLiga!!Total
|-
|1||||Pat Onstad||11||1||0||0||1
!14
|-
|2||||Zach Wells||2||0||0||2||1
!5
|-
! colspan="3" |Total!!13!!1!!0!!2!!2!!19

Honors and awards

MLS Player of the Week

MLS Goal of the Week

Annual

Dynamo team awards

Uniforms

References

External links
2007 Houston Dynamo Schedule
2007 Houston Dynamo Stats

2007
Houston Dynamo
Hou
Houston Dynamo
MLS Cup champion seasons